The 1940 NFL Championship Game, sometimes referred to simply as 73–0, was the eighth title game of the National Football League (NFL).  It was played at Griffith Stadium in Washington, D.C. on December 8, with a sellout capacity attendance of 36,034.

The Chicago Bears (8–3) of the Western Division met the Washington Redskins (9–2), champions of the Eastern Division. Neither team had played in the title game since 1937, when the Redskins won a close game at Chicago's Wrigley Field. For this game in Washington, the Bears entered as slight favorites.

The Bears scored eleven touchdowns and won 73–0, the most one-sided victory in NFL history. The game was broadcast on radio by Mutual Broadcasting System, the first NFL title game broadcast nationwide.

Background
Washington had defeated Chicago 7–3 in a regular season game three weeks earlier in Washington. After the contest, Redskins owner George Preston Marshall told reporters that the Bears were crybabies and quitters when the going got tough. As the Bears prepared for the rematch, Chicago head coach George Halas fired up his team by showing them newspaper articles containing Marshall's comments, then said, "Gentlemen, this is what George Preston Marshall thinks of you. Well, I think you're a GREAT football team! Now, go out there and prove it!"

Before the game, Halas's friend Clark Shaughnessy, who was concurrently coaching the undefeated Stanford Indians, helped the Bears' gameplan. Shaughnessy devised several counters for linebacker shifts that he had noted the Redskins using.

Game summary
The Bears controlled the game right from the start, using the T formation as their primary offensive strategy. On their second play from scrimmage, running back Bill Osmanski ran 68 yards for a touchdown. Washington then marched to the Chicago 26-yard line on their ensuing drive, but wide receiver Charlie Malone dropped a sure touchdown pass in the end zone that would have tied the game. The field goal attempt on 4th down was missed as well.

Later in the first quarter, Bears quarterback Sid Luckman scored on a 1-yard touchdown run to increase the lead 14–0. On their third drive, Joe Maniaci ran 42 yards for the Bears' third touchdown of the game.

The Bears held a 28–0 halftime lead and then continued to crush the Redskins, scoring 45 points during the second half. After Halas took the team's starters out, the backup players continued to pile on the points. The Bears ended up recording 501 total yards on offense, 382 total rushing yards, and 8 interceptions—returning 3 for touchdowns, all in the third quarter.

So many footballs were kicked into the stands after touchdowns that officials asked Halas to run or pass for the point after touchdown on the last two touchdowns.

This game also marked the last time that an NFL player (Bears end Dick Plasman) played without a helmet.

Reportedly, after the final gun went off, a sports writer jokingly yelled, "Marshall just shot himself!" Marshall's only statement to the press was, "We needed a 50 man line against their power."

Redskins quarterback Sammy Baugh was interviewed after the game, and a sportswriter asked him whether the game would have been different had Malone not dropped the tying touchdown pass. Baugh reportedly quipped, "Sure. The final score would have been 73–7."

Legacy
As of 2021, Chicago's 73 points is the most scored by one team in any NFL game, regular season or postseason. The margin of victory is not only the largest ever in the NFL, but also stood as the biggest blowout in all major American professional team sports for more than eight decades. On December 2, 2021, the NBA's Memphis Grizzlies matched this feat with a 73-point victory over the Oklahoma City Thunder. (Memphis led by as many as 78 points in that contest.)

Chicago's seven rushing touchdowns is the second-most touchdowns (by both teams in one game) in league history and the most ever in a postseason game.

The First Fifty Years, a 1969 book that chronicles the first half century of the NFL, listed the game as one of "Ten [Games] That Mattered" to the growth of pro football in the United States. "On a Sunday in the 1940 December," the book states, "the Chicago Bears played perfect football for a greater percentage of the official hour than any team before or since. In the championship game, as an underdog to the team which had just beaten them, the Bears made an eleven-touchdown pile and used it as a pedestal to raise the NFL to view in all corners of the country.... Pro football, the T-formation and the Chicago Bears were the sudden sports news of the year."

Scoring summary
Sunday, December 8, 1940
Kickoff: 1:30 p.m. EST

First Quarter
CHI TD – Bill Osmanski 68-yard run (Jack Manders kick), CHI 7–0
CHI TD – Sid Luckman 1-yard run (Bob Snyder kick), CHI 14–0
CHI TD – Joe Maniaci 42-yard run (Phil Martinovich kick), CHI 21–0
Second Quarter
CHI TD – Ken Kavanaugh 30-yard pass from Luckman (Snyder kick), CHI 28–0
Third Quarter
CHI TD – Hamp Pool 15-yard interception return (Dick Plasman kick), CHI 35–0
CHI TD – Ray Nolting 23-yard run (kick failed), CHI 41–0
CHI TD – George McAfee 35-yard interception return (Joe Stydahar kick), CHI 48–0
CHI TD – Bulldog Turner 20-yard interception return (kick failed), CHI 54–0
Fourth Quarter
CHI TD – Harry Clarke 44-yard run (kick failed), CHI 60–0
CHI TD – Gary Famiglietti 2-yard run (Maniaci pass from Solly Sherman), CHI 67–0
CHI TD – Clarke 1-yard run (pass failed) CHI 73–0

Officials
Referee: William "Red" Friesall
Umpire: Harry Robb
Head Linesman: Irv Kupcinet
Field Judge: Fred Young

Statistics
Source: 3

Statistical comparison

Individual leaders

*Completions/Attempts

Players' shares
The net gate receipts from the sellout were over $102,000, a record, and each Bear player received $874 while each Redskin saw $606.

References

Notes

Nash, Bruce, and Allen Zullo (1986). The Football Hall of Shame, 80–82, Pocket Books. .
The Sporting News Complete Super Bowl Book 1995, 391, The Sporting News Publishing Co. .
1Peterson, Robert. "Pigskin: The Early Years of Pro Football" (1997) p. 132 Oxford University Press 
2Taylor, Roy.  "1940's Chicago Bears, Another Dynasty" (2004) http://www.bearshistory.com/seasons/1940schicagobears.aspx
3The NFL's Official Encyclopedic History of Professional Football, (1973), p. 105, Macmillan Publishing Co. New York, NY, LCCN No. 73-3862

Champ
National Football League Championship games
Chicago Bears postseason
Washington Redskins postseason
NFL Championship Game
NFL Championship Game